Samuel Stewart Booth (20 April 1926 – 25 September 1968) is a Scottish former professional footballer who played as a wing half.

Career
Born in Shotts, Booth played for Derry City, Exeter City, Bradford City and Bideford.

References

1926 births
1968 deaths
Scottish footballers
Derry City F.C. players
Exeter City F.C. players
Bradford City A.F.C. players
Bideford A.F.C. players
English Football League players
Association football wing halves